The 1983 Los Angeles Dodgers rebounded from being eliminated from the playoffs on the final day of the previous season to win their second National League Western Division title in three years, but lost in the National League Championship Series to the Philadelphia Phillies 3 games to 1.

Offseason 
 December 28, 1982: Acquired Pat Zachry from the New York Mets for Jorge Orta.
 January 20, 1983: Acquired Vance Lovelace and Dan Cataline from the Chicago Cubs for Ron Cey.
 March 28, 1983: Acquired Ivan Mesa from the Minnesota Twins for Tack Wilson.
 March 29, 1983: Acquired Steve Walker, Jody Johnston and cash from the New York Mets for Mark Bradley.

Regular season

Season standings

Record vs. opponents

Opening Day lineup

Roster

Notable transactions 
 May 2, 1983: Tom Klawitter was released by the Dodgers.
 May 9, 1983: Acquired Rafael Landestoy from the Cincinnati Reds for Brett Wise and John Franco
 August 19, 1983: Dave Stewart, Ricky Wright and cash were traded by the Dodgers to the Texas Rangers for Rick Honeycutt.

Player stats

Batting

Starters by position 
Note: Pos = Position; G = Games played; AB = At bats; H = Hits; Avg. = Batting average; HR = Home runs; RBI = Runs batted in

Other batters 
Note: G = Games played; AB = At bats; H = Hits; Avg. = Batting average; HR = Home runs; RBI = Runs batted in

Pitching

Starting pitchers 
Note: G = Games pitched; IP = Innings pitched; W = Wins; L = Losses; ERA = Earned run average; SO = Strikeouts

Other pitchers 
Note: G = Games pitched; IP = Innings pitched; W = Wins; L = Losses; ERA = Earned run average; SO = Strikeouts

Relief pitchers 
Note: G = Games pitched; W = Wins; L = Losses; SV = Saves; ERA = Earned run average; SO = Strikeouts

Game log

|- bgcolor="bbbbbb"
| – || July 6 || 54th All-Star Game || colspan=6 | National League vs. American League (Comiskey Park, Chicago, Illinois)
|-

|-
| Legend:       = Win       = Loss       = PostponementBold = Dodgers team member

1983 National League Championship Series 

The National League West champion Dodgers faced the National League East champion Philadelphia Phillies in the 1983 NLCS and lost the series 3 games to 1.  Noteworthy was that the Dodgers had won 11 of 12 games against the Phillies during the regular season.

Game 1 
October 4, Dodger Stadium

Game 2 
October 5, Dodger Stadium

Game 3 
October 7, Veterans Stadium

Game 4 
October 8, Veterans Stadium

Postseason game log

Awards and honors 
 1983 Major League Baseball All-Star Game
Steve Sax starter
Pedro Guerrero reserve
Fernando Valenzuela reserve
Silver Slugger Award
Fernando Valenzuela
NL Pitcher of the Month
Burt Hooton (June 1983)
NL Player of the Month
Dusty Baker (July 1983)
NL Player of the Week
Dusty Baker (July 11–17)
Mike Marshall (Sep. 5–11)

Farm system 

Teams in BOLD won League Championships

Major League Baseball Draft

The Dodgers drafted 35 players in the June draft and 17 in the January draft. Of those, six players would eventually play in the Major Leagues. They received two extra picks in the 2nd round as compensation for losing free agents Steve Garvey and Terry Forster.

The first round pick in the June draft was pitcher Erik Sonberg of Wichita State University. He played six seasons in the minors and was 19-38 with a 6.20 ERA in 107 games. None of this years signings amounted to much of anything in the Majors.

Notes

References 
Baseball-Reference season page
Baseball Almanac season page

External links 
1983 Los Angeles Dodgers uniform
Los Angeles Dodgers official web site

Los Angeles Dodgers seasons
Los Angeles Dodgers season
National League West champion seasons
Los